Trichodes leucopsideus is a beetle species of checkered beetle belonging to the family Cleridae, subfamily Clerinae.

Description
It is a hairy small-medium size beetle with shining blue or black head and scutellum. The elongated elytra show a bright reddish orange colour with black bands. This species can easily be distinguished from other Trichodes species by the two small black spots in front of the elytra.

Distribution
These beetles are found in France, Italy, Spain, Germany, Portugal and in North Africa.

Ecology
At the larval stage these beetles are parasites of bees, as the females lay the eggs in the nests of wild bees or in hives of honey bees. After hatching larvae feed on larvae and nymphs of their victims.

However, they integrate their diet with small insects that they actively hunt.

References

External links
Biolib

leucopsideus
Beetles of Europe
Beetles described in 1795